Lamotte Township may refer to the following places in the United States:

 Lamotte Township, Crawford County, Illinois
 Lamotte Township, Michigan